Givak-e Sofla (also Romanized as Gīvak-e Soflá and Geyūk Soflá; also known as Gīvak-e Pā’īn and Givak Pa’in) is a village in Baqeran Rural District, in the Central District of Birjand County, South Khorasan Province, Iran. At the 2006 census, its population was 28, in 11 families.

References 

Populated places in Birjand County